CBL may refer to:

CBC Radio 
 CBL-FM, a CBC Radio Two radio station in Toronto, Ontario
 CBLA-FM in Toronto had the call sign CBL for much of the period when it was on the AM band (1937–99)

Sports leagues and associations 
 Canadian Baseball League (defunct)
 Canadian Basketball League
 China Baseball League, the pre-eminent men's baseball league in China
 Chinese Basketball League, former name of the National Basketball League, a men's semi-professional basketball minor league in China
 Citrus Belt League, a division II high school sports league in Southern California.
 Conference Basketball League, a former men's basketball minor league in New Zealand
 Continental Baseball League
 Continental Basketball League, a men's professional basketball minor league in the United States
 Celebrity Badminton League, an India-based badminton league for celebrities

Institutions
 Carl Barks Library
 Catholic Benevolent Legion
 Central Bank of Liberia
 Central Bank of Libya
 Chesapeake Biological Laboratory
 Conemaugh and Black Lick Railroad, a defunct railroad in Pennsylvania
 Chester Beatty Library

Science and engineering
 Cannabicyclol, a cannabinoid found in cannabis
 CBL / Computer Bureau Limited, parent company of Datacom Group
 CBL (gene) found in mammals
 Calculator-Based Laboratory, a data-collection and logging system by Texas Instruments
 Composite Blocking List
 Computer-based learning
 Convective Boundary Layer, the part of the atmosphere most directly affected by solar heating of the earth's surface
 CBL-Mariner, a free and open source cloud infrastructure operating system based on Linux and developed by Microsoft

Other uses 
 CBL & Associates Properties
 CBL, the ticker symbol for CBL & Associates Properties
 Cambuslang railway station, a UK railway station
 Carbon Based Lifeforms, a Swedish electronic music duo
 Cement bond log
 Cerebellum
 Challenge-based learning
 Choice-based lettings (see Public Housing#United Kingdom)
 Clare Boothe Luce
 Confidence-based learning
 Controlled buoyant lift, an underwater diver-rescue technique used in recreational scuba diving
 Cross-body lead, a dance move
 Cross-border leasing